Ergen is a Turkish surname. Notable people with the surname include:

 Charlie Ergen (born 1953), American businessman
 Gülben Ergen (born 1972), Turkish singer and actress
 Mehmet Ergen, British theatre director, producer, and entrepreneur

Turkish-language surnames